Rawle Cecil Brancker (19 November 1937 – 27 July 2021) was a Barbadian cricketer. A left-handed batsman and slow left-arm orthodox spin bowler, Brancker was an all rounder for Barbados between 1956 and 1970. He made 47 appearances in first class cricket, scoring 1,666 runs at an average of 27.31 with five centuries and taking 106 wickets at 27.32 runs per wicket. 

In his six matches for Barbados in the 1964-65 and 1965-66 seasons he scored 414 runs at 103.50 with three centuries, and took 18 wickets at 26.11, and was selected to tour England with the West Indian cricket team in England in 1966. He had occasional success as a bowler on the tour, taking seven Kent wickets for 73 runs, which remained the best bowling figures of his career. As a batsman he made a top score of only 37 on the tour, and he was not used for any of the Tests. 

His top first-class score was 135 not out against Jamaica in 1966-67. He captained Barbados in the match against the MCC in 1967-68.

He went on to join the West Indies 2007 Cricket World Cup Committee in 2003, however he resigned in 2005 citing irreconcilable differences with officials Chris Dehring and Teddy Griffith. He was succeeded by Ken Gordon, West Indies Cricket Board president.

Brancker was a co-founder of the Barbados Lumber Company and the owner of Brancker's on Fontabelle, the hardware store he founded in 1974.

References

External links
 
 Rawle Brancker at Cricket Archive

1937 births
2021 deaths
People from Saint Michael, Barbados
People educated at Combermere School
Barbadian cricketers
Barbados cricketers
Barbadian businesspeople